Ma Sheng (born 18 February 1997) is a Chinese footballer currently playing as a defender for Nantong Zhiyun.

Club career
Ma Sheng would move to Beijing from Anqing, Anhui to study before joining the Hebei Elite youth training program, where they sent their youth players to study abroad in Brazil. He would catch the attention of Botafogo-SP's youth training director who kept him at the club throughout his youth development. He would go on to return to Hebei and start his senior professional career with them. He remained with them for several seasons until he joined second tier club Nantong Zhiyun on 18 March 2021. He would go on to make his debut in a league game on 1 May 2021 against Kunshan in a 1-0 victory. He would go on to establish himself within the team and helped the club gain promotion to the top tier at the end of the 2022 China League One season.

Career statistics
.

References

External links

1997 births
Living people
Chinese footballers
Association football defenders
China League Two players
China League One players
Nantong Zhiyun F.C. players